Ítalo Argentino Lúder (31 December 1916 – 25 May 2008) was an Argentine Justicialist Party politician. As provisional president of the Argentine Senate, Lúder served as the acting President of Argentina from 13 September 1975 until 16 October 1975, deputizing for Isabel Perón. Lúder was also the Justicialist Party's 1983 presidential candidate, a National Deputy, one of Carlos Menem's defense ministers, and Argentina's ambassador to France.

Background and earlier life

Lúder was born in Rafaela, Santa Fe Province. He enrolled at his province's National University of the Littoral, where he received a juris doctor in 1938. Lúder was first elected to a seat in the Constitutional Convention of 1948, which drafted president Juan Perón's 1949 replacement of the 1853 Constitution of Argentina. Following Perón's 1955 overthrow, however, the original document was reinstated, and the exiled Perón entrusted Lúder with his legal defense in absentia vis-á-vis extensive corruption charges.

Lúder was elected to the Argentine Senate as a Peronist for Santa Fe Province in 1973. Upon the resignation of Senate President Alejandro Díaz Bialet in July, Lúder was elected to that post. Following President Juan Perón's 1974 death, Isabel Perón became head of state, though by September 1975, mounting instability led her to announce a month's sick leave.

Acting President of Argentina

Lacking a Vice President, the post of acting President of Argentina fell to Lúder, whose brief tenure would later be remembered chiefly for his signing of Decrees 2770-2772, which created a "Council for Internal Security", in response to Operation Primicia, a guerrilla attack carried out by Montoneros on a military barracks at Formosa Province. The measure, combined with prior ones, was successful in quelling an insurgent campaign led by the leftist ERP in Tucumán Province, though it in practice extended a state of siege nationwide.

Later Peronist leadership and other roles

Lúder was nominated candidate for president for the Justicialist Party during the 1983 elections that resulted in the return of democracy following nearly eight years of dictatorship. The strong support of his candidacy by the CGT labor union could not compensate, however, for the Peronists' late start (the nomination was secured less than two months before election day), the rival UCR nominee Raúl Alfonsín's skillful campaign, or voters' bitter memories of Isabel Perón's chaotic tenure, among other problems. Lúder was defeated on election night by around 12%.

He was appointed Defense Secretary by newly elected President Carlos Menem in 1989, but a cabinet shake-up on the heels of a crisis at the end of the year led to his replacement, whereby Lúder was named Ambassador to France.  Ítalo Lúder died from complications of Alzheimer's disease at the age of 91, on May 25, 2008, in Buenos Aires.

External links
 Italo Luder dies

1916 births
2008 deaths
People from Rafaela
Argentine people of German descent
Justicialist Party politicians
20th-century Argentine lawyers
Members of the Argentine Senate for Buenos Aires Province
Defense ministers of Argentina
Candidates for President of Argentina
National University of the Littoral alumni
Ambassadors of Argentina to France
Deaths from dementia in Argentina
Deaths from Alzheimer's disease